The Cathedral of the Isles and Collegiate Church of the Holy Spirit is a Category A listed cathedral of the Scottish Episcopal Church in the town of Millport on the Isle of Cumbrae. It is one of the two cathedrals of the Diocese of Argyll and the Isles, the other being St John's Cathedral in Oban. From 2021 the office of Provost has been held by Keith Riglin, Bishop of Argyll and The Isles.

History
George Boyle, 6th Earl of Glasgow, was benefactor of the cathedral and the associated theological college and commissioned William Butterfield to design the building. Butterfield was one of the great architects of the Gothic revival and also designed St Ninian's Cathedral in Perth. Construction finished in 1849 and the cathedral opened in 1851 as a collegiate church. The Chapel of the College of the Holy Spirit was raised to the status of a cathedral in 1876.

Features
Formal gardens and woodland surround the cathedral, the tallest building on Great Cumbrae and the smallest cathedral in the British Isles. The tower dominates the buildings: at 123 ft, the tower and spire are three times the length of the 40 ft nave.

In the entrance porch is an interesting collection of Celtic crosses, all of which were excavated on the island in Victorian times.

The stained glass is by William Wailes (west window) and Hardman & Co.

The organ is by Philip Wood of Huddersfield. It was installed in 2004, having been relocated from Logie Pert Parish Church, and replacing an organ by John Compton.

The organist is Alastair Chisholm, who was awarded a BEM in 2016 for services to music and culture.

Theological College
The theological college existed from 1851, for 34 years. From 1919 to 1927 the college buildings housed nuns from the Community of St Andrew of Scotland (CSAS).

For ten years from 1975 it hosted a community, the Community of Celebration Christian Trust.

The college is now a retreat house, the College of the Holy Spirit, and is open to the public to stay.

Provosts
The Provosts are sometimes referred to as Provosts of the Cathedral of the Isles, and sometimes as Provosts of Cumbrae. Since Provost MacGregor, the Provost has been the Diocesan Bishop for the time being. (There is also an office of Dean of the United Diocese, which is separately held.) Incomplete list:

Herbert Noyes (1875-1883), subsequently Dean of the United Diocese
Alexander Chinnery-Haldane (1883-1891), concurrently Bishop of Argyll & the Isles (1883-1906)
Thomas Ball (1892-1916), who died in office.
Robert Taylor (1919-1926)
Claude O'Flaherty (1926-1939)
John Macarthur (1940-1949)
George Douglas (1949-1973), who died in office.
After Fr Douglas, the office of Provost was held by the Bishop.
Graham Pulkingham (1975-1980)
Gregor MacGregor (1986-1987), subsequently Bishop of Moray, Ross and Caithness
Thereafter the office of Provost has been held by the Bishop.

References

External links

 Friends of the Cathedral of the Isles
 YouTube of the Cathedral and College
 Cathedral Website

Millport
Churches in North Ayrshire
Gothic Revival church buildings in Scotland
Category A listed buildings in North Ayrshire
Listed cathedrals in Scotland
William Butterfield buildings
Millport, Cumbrae